The Pioneers is a 1916 Australian silent film directed by Franklyn Barrett. The film is based on the debut novel by Katharine Susannah Prichard which won £250 in a 1915 literary competition. It is considered a lost film.

It was later filmed by Raymond Longford as The Pioneers (1926).

Plot
A convict, Dan Farrel, escapes from Van Diemen's Land and throws himself on the mercy of a farming couple, Mary and Donald Cameron. The years pass and Dan becomes a school teacher. He marries and they have a daughter, Dierdre, but his wife dies.

Dierdre grows up and agrees to marry a local pub keeper, McNab, to stop him from revealing that Dan is a convict. McNab still goes to the police and Dan is arrested. Dierdre accidentally kills McNab.

Cast
Winter Hall as Dan Farrel
Alma Rock Phillips as Deidre
Lily Rochefort as Mary Cameron
Charles Knight as Donald Cameron
Fred St Clair as Davey Cameron
Irve Hayman as Thad McNab
Martyn Keith as Steve
Fred Neilson as Fighting Conal
Nell Rose as Jessie
George Willougbhy
Charles Villiers

Production
The film was shot in early 1915 near Gosford and in a studio owned by Franklyn Barrett.

Rock Phillips of J. C. Williamson Ltd wrote that the film ushered a new level of professionalism in Australian filmmaking:
The local productions, to date, with the exceptions of, say, half a dozen, have been absolutely ruined by - inferior acting, being badly cast and carelessly dressed. That is only what can be expected when those in charge of the financial part of the business, pay so little for services rendered, there being no inducement for the best class of 'pro' to enter this business. When they offer the capable artist a fair salary commensurate with his or her ability, then, and not till then, will Australian-made pictures hold their own with the best on the other side... The director of tho latest Australian venture in the Movie business has recognised the above, in filming... The Pioneers... Besides getting together a company of well-known players' he is paying them top salaries. Expense is a secondary consideration, the goal aimed at being an evenly and well acted story.

Reception
Reviews were generally positive.

See also
List of lost films

References

External links

The Pioneers at National Film and Sound Archive

1916 films
Australian drama films
Australian silent films
Australian black-and-white films
Lost Australian films
1916 drama films
1916 lost films
Lost drama films
Films set in colonial Australia
Films directed by Franklyn Barrett
Silent drama films
1910s English-language films